Gainesville Roller Rebels (GRR) is a women's flat track roller derby league based in Gainesville, Florida. Founded in 2007, the league consists of a home team and an all star team which competes against teams from other leagues. Gainesville is a member of the Women's Flat Track Derby Association (WFTDA).

History
The league was founded in late 2007 by Catherine Seemann, known as "Ms. Rebel".  She recruited skaters using a variety of methods, including flyering, posting on MySpace, and talking to friends.

By late 2009, the league was playing regularly to crowds of around 400 people, and beat the Tallahassee Rollergirls in an upset.

The league was accepted into the Women's Flat Track Derby Association Apprentice Program in January 2012, and it graduated to full membership in December 2012.

In March 2013, the league debuted in the Women's Flat Track Derby Association's rankings at 51, the highest entry by a previously unranked team and the first to debut within the top 100.

WFTDA rankings

References

Roller derby leagues established in 2007
Roller derby leagues in Florida
Sports in Gainesville, Florida
Women's Flat Track Derby Association Division 3
2007 establishments in Florida